Madhogarh is a constituency of the Uttar Pradesh Legislative Assembly covering the city of Madhogarh in the Jalaun district of Uttar Pradesh, India.

Madhogarh is one of five assembly constituencies in the Jalaun Lok Sabha constituency. Since 2008, this assembly constituency is numbered 219 amongst 403 constituencies.

Currently this seat belongs to Bharatiya Janta Party candidate Moolchandra Niranjan who won in last Assembly election of 2017 Uttar Pradesh Legislative Elections defeating Bahujan Samaj Party candidate Girish Kumar by a margin of 45,985 votes.

References

External links
 

Assembly constituencies of Uttar Pradesh
Jalaun district